Drienov is a village and municipality in the Prešov District in the Prešov Region of eastern Slovakia.

History
The village was first mentioned in historical records in 1284.

Geography

Population 
It has a population of about 2,254 people (2020-12-31).

Notable people
 Jolana Kirczová (* 1909 – † 1936) – art ceramic works
 Albín Korem (* 1941 – † 2006) – writer

Genealogical resources
The records for genealogical research are available at the state archive "Statny Archiv in Kosice, Presov, Slovakia"
 Roman Catholic church records (births/marriages/deaths): 1743-1895 (parish A)
 Greek Catholic church records (births/marriages/deaths): 1773-1895 (parish B)
 Lutheran church records (births/marriages/deaths): 1787-1895 (parish B)

See also
 List of municipalities and towns in Slovakia

References

External links
 
 
https://web.archive.org/web/20071116010355/http://www.statistics.sk/mosmis/eng/run.html
Surnames of living people in Drienov

Villages and municipalities in Prešov District
Šariš